Nonofo Molefhi is a Motswana politician.

References

1959 births
Living people
Members of the National Assembly (Botswana)
Botswana Democratic Party politicians
Government ministers of Botswana